The UTS Vicki Sara Building, also known as the Science Faculty Building, is the building housing the Faculty of Science and the Graduate School of Health in the University of Technology Sydney in New South Wales, Australia. It is the third building to be opened under the plan for $154 million worth of structures designed by Durbach Block Jaggers (DBJ) in association with BVN Architecture constructed by Richard Crookes Constructions. The building is located in the City Campus at 67 Thomas St, Ultimo. It was completed in October 2014 and opened for teaching in February 2015. The building has 8 levels that provide spaces for over 1200 staff and students. Three of these floors are distinguished for its state of art teaching, learning and research facilities, which have been located underground.

The organic form of the building is inspired by the shapes of grove of trees. The undulatory form of the building is inflected by 700 multi-colored, box-like openings piercing the glossy off-white surface of the façade. Considerably, the external cladding has been crafted from more than 75% recycled glass.

Concept and design 
The new Science and Graduate School of the Health Building (Building 7) is connected to Building 4. This has been created for the new science and health teaching, learning and research precinct. The faculty is recognized by its natural rendered and organic flowing lines. The building's exterior is motivated by a grove of ripping trees that accentuate approximately 700 colourful box-style windows. This allows natural light to flow into the building.

The project had conflicting objectives and requirements. Since the faculty was going to be located in the new official heart of the campus, the building had to be architecturally distinguished and dignified. However, a tall building on the site would shade the green space of the Alumni Green.  The architect's solution was to extend the building horizontally along an east-west axis and to pull the face back at two points along its front elevation (overlooking the Alumni Green), thus fulfilling the brief's solar obligations. DBJ believes that the curved form and white reflective surface provide more light for the interior spaces (it functions like concave lenses). Moreover, the play in scale of the box-style windows and their overlapping pattern not only accentuates the undulating rhythm of the façade but also transforms the three-storey facade into something that appears much more substantial. This ingenious play in scale has given the building a civic presence.

Key features

Spiral stair 
As the building's particular aisle, the spiral staircase allows beautiful light from the skylight above. This allows light into the super lab. It consists of 950m2 small pastel tiles from Spain in order to create an active, welcoming and warm atmosphere for students and visitors.

Super Lab 
The super lab is the 52-metre-long room, which can accommodate over 220 students. It is configured into 12 different classrooms, allowing  different classes to be held at the same time. There are other particular labs throughout the building which provide the faculty with maximum flexibility.

Green auditorium and flask-shaped lighting 

Besides the spiral staircase and spacious laboratory rooms, the auditorium itself has been designed in a way to involve and inspire students and visitors by entering the space. The architects encourage innovation and creativity by designing conical flask lighting. This flask shape bulbs create a light vibrant green colour. Green is known as the colour of creativity and is also well known as the best colour to create a peaceful mind in order to facilitate the reception of knowledge and information. Moreover, the conical flask lighting visually reminds visitors about building's function. Good architecture creates forms and spaces in a way that can visually respond to its function.

Sustainability 
Sustainability has been considered throughout the building and the significant examples of this green practice can be seen through the roof garden. A green roof for research and the external cladding of the building, which is made out of 75% recycled glass.  Notably, 27,000-litre rainwater tank supply is recycled water for the rooftop garden and the building's toilets. The ventilation system has been integrated with a natural cooling system which  reduces energy use by up to 20%.

The Faculty of Science and Graduate School of Health Building has used many strategies in order to improve sustainability. Critical environmental practices include:
 High efficient façade
 Rainwater harvesting
 Water-saving sanitary appliances
 Sustainable building materials
 Recycled materials
 Low-emitting materials and finishes
 Sustainable urban drainage system
 Smart design (passive design strategies)
 Maximised day-lighting system.

Notable awards 
 2015 NSW Architecture Awards: Inaugural William E. Kemp Award for Educational Architecture.
 2015 Sydney Design Awards: Gold Winner, Architecture – Mixed Use – Constructed.

Gallery

See also 
 Holman House, Dover Heights
 List of universities in Australia

References 

Buildings and structures in Sydney
University of Technology Sydney
University and college buildings in Australia